Tyronza is a city in Poinsett County, Arkansas, United States. The population was 762 at the 2010 census. It is included in the Jonesboro, Arkansas Metropolitan Statistical Area and is in the Arkansas Delta.

Geography
Tyronza is located at  (35.487, -90.357).

According to the United States Census Bureau, the town has a total area of 4.1 km (1.6 mi2), all land.

History

Tyronza is one of the oldest cities within Poinsett County with its origins dating back to the late 19th century. In the 1930s, it was the site where the Southern Tenant Farmers movement started what became a national outcry against the abusive discrimination by wealthy land owners against the mostly African-American sharecroppers. A  museum in the city, operated by Arkansas State University, highlights the history of organizing by tenant farmers in order to secure better prices and conditions, and the history of the region.

Tyronza was the home of Dr. L. H. McDaniel, a local physician who became friends with President Lyndon Baines Johnson through his political involvement in the Democratic Party. McDaniel was a close advisor to Johnson and to U.S. House Ways and Means Chairman Wilbur D. Mills (D-Arkansas) in the creation of the Medicare and Medicaid programs which began in 1965, the year McDaniel died. He treated patients all over eastern Arkansas regardless of their ability to pay and often accepted live chickens, baked goods and garden vegetables as payment for his home visits. McDaniel was a national delegate to Democratic Conventions in the 1950s and brought national political and medical leaders to Tyronza with conferences he set up in huge 1,000-seat tents on the outskirts of the city.

Although the community started as a county farming and retail center, it has become a bedroom community for its many residents who work in Jonesboro or Memphis but who prefer the small town lifestyle.

Demographics

2020 census

As of the 2020 United States census, there were 716 people, 376 households, and 268 families residing in the city.

2000 census
At the 2000 census, of 2000, there were 918 people, 363 households and 257 families residing in the town. The population density was 225.8/km (586.5/mi2). There were 388 housing units at an average density of 95.4/km (247.9/mi2). The racial makeup of the town was 94.12% White, 3.70% Black or African American, 0.54% from other races, and 1.63% from two or more races. 0.65% of the population were Hispanic or Latino of any race.

There were 363 households, of which 34.7% had children under the age of 18 living with them, 54.5% were married couples living together, 12.1% had a female householder with no husband present, and 29.2% were non-families. 26.7% of all households were made up of individuals, and 12.7% had someone living alone who was 65 years of age or older. The average household size was 2.53 and the average family size was 3.09.

26.1% of the population were under the age of 18, 12.1% from 18 to 24, 25.6% from 25 to 44, 24.7% from 45 to 64, and 11.4% who were 65 years of age or older. The median age was 35 years. For every 100 females, there were 100.0 males. For every 100 females age 18 and over, there were 96.0 males.

The median household income was $30,188 and the median family income was $34,333. Males had a median income of $30,820 and females $20,625. The per capita income was $12,984. About 17.2% of families and 21.6% of the population were below the poverty line, including 29.3% of those under age 18 and 24.0% of those age 65 or over.

Education
The East Poinsett County School District operates public schools, including East Poinsett County High School.

The Tyronza School District consolidated into the East Poinsett district on July 1, 1986.

Notable people

Mignon Dunn, opera singer

Gallery

References

Further reading
 

Cities in Poinsett County, Arkansas
Cities in Arkansas
Jonesboro metropolitan area